Roberts Island may refer to:
 Roberts Island (California), an island in the San Joaquin River Delta
 Roberts Island, Nova Scotia, a community in Canada
 Roberts Island complex, an archaeological site in Florida
 Robert Island, an island in the South Shetland Islands

See also
 Robert Island (Paracel Islands), an island in the South China Sea